Robert "Bob" Amsberry is an American college basketball coach. He is the current head women's basketball coach at Wartburg College in Waverly, Iowa.

Coaching career

Rockford College
Amsberry became the head coach of Rockford College in 1997 and inherited a losing streak that reached 70 games. In just three seasons he went from 0–25 to 18–8, orchestrating one of the best turnarounds in NCAA history.  They would go on to win three consecutive conference titles from 2004 to 2006.

Wartburg College
Amsberry has led the Knights to the NCAA tournament for seven consecutive years, including two final four appearances in 2016 and 2018. His 2017–18 season was the first undefeated regular season in program history. The Knights reached their highest ranking in school history when they reached No. 2 in both the WBCA and D3hoops.com polls. The Knights started the season with a school-record 31 consecutive victories before eventually falling in the Final Four to Bowdoin College and finishing the season 31–1. Amsberry received the 2018 DIII WBCA National Coach of the Year Award, for their school record performance in 2017–2018. He was also a finalist for the award in both 2016 and 2019. In addition, he has been awarded the Iowa Basketball Coaches’ Association Paul Maske Memorial Coach of the Year award four times.

Head coaching record

References

External links 
Women's Basketball Yearly Results (PDF) 
Basketball - Conference Tournament History
Wartburg women's basketball team two wins shy of a Division III national title ... and perfection
Bob Amsberry Named Wartburg Women's Basketball Coach
Bob Amsberry Coaching profile

Living people
Year of birth missing (living people)
Basketball coaches from Iowa
Wartburg College